Grace Davitt (born 25 December 1982) is an Irish female rugby union player. She was in 's 2014 Women's Rugby World Cup squad in France. She also played in two previous World Cup's in 2006 and 2010. Davitt was a member of the 2013 Women's Six Nations Championship team.

Davitt is a Maintenance Technician.

References

1982 births
Living people
Irish female rugby union players
Ireland women's international rugby union players
Rugby union centres